Accinctapubes apicalis is a species of snout moth in the genus Accinctapubes. It was described by William Schaus in 1906, and is known from southern Mexico, Brazil, Bolivia, Ecuador, and Venezuela.

References

Moths described in 1906
Epipaschiinae
Moths of Central America
Moths of South America